In the Now is an album by the drummer Cindy Blackman, recorded in 1997 and released on the HighNote label.

Reception

Ken Dryden of AllMusic stated, "Cindy Blackman has proved herself as an accomplished percussionist who doesn't overdo it, but there's something missing from this outing. ... most of her compositions, which make up the bulk of the CD, just don't hold one's interest. ... Instead, check out Blackman's earlier efforts". In JazzTimes, Bill Milkowski called it "her most profound and heartfelt statement to date" and wrote: "After years of trying to find her own place in the music, Cindy Blackman arrives in high style with In the Now.

The Washington Post's Mike Joyce commented: "For all its spontaneous interplay and improvisations... In the Now is firmly rooted in the past... Blackman is the principal composer, arranger and catalyst, contributing seven of the session's nine tunes and shaping all of them with a keen sense of dynamics, drama and texture. While her presence isn't overpowering, it is always felt."

Track listing 
All compositions by Cindy Blackman except where noted
 "In The Now" – 6:45
 "A Banana for Ron" – 3:22
 "Passage" – 6:40
 "A King Among Men" – 15:00
 "Sophia" – 7:24
 "Prince of Darkness" (Wayne Shorter) – 7:13
 "Happy House" (Ornette Coleman) – 4:34
 "A Strawberry for Cindy" – 4:30
 "Let Love Rule" (Lenny Kravitz) – 7:55

Personnel 
Cindy Blackman - drums
Ravi Coltrane - tenor saxophone, soprano saxophone 
Jacky Terrasson - piano, Fender Rhodes 
Ron Carter - bass

References 

Cindy Blackman albums
1998 albums
HighNote Records albums
Albums recorded at Van Gelder Studio